Jurong Lake District MRT station is a future underground Mass Rapid Transit station on the Cross Island line (CRL) located in Jurong East, Singapore. First announced in September 2022, the station is expected to be completed in 2032 along with the other CRL Phase 2 stations.

History
Jurong Lake District station was first announced on 20 September 2022 by Transport Minister S Iswaran. The station will be constructed as part of Phase 2 of the Cross Island line (CRL), a  segment spanning six stations from Turf City station to this station. The station is expected to be completed in 2032.

Details
Jurong Lake District station will serve the Cross Island line (CRL) and have an official station code of CR19. The station will be located in the future Jurong Lake District. Due to the station's proximity to the nearby Jurong Town Hall station on the Jurong Region line, transport minister Iswaran stated a connection between the two stations is being studied, but added that the two stations are intended to serve "different commuter movement objectives".

References

Proposed railway stations in Singapore
Mass Rapid Transit (Singapore) stations
Railway stations scheduled to open in 2032